The Blaan people are a Philippine tribe.

Blaan may also refer to:

Saint Blane, Irish saint
Blaan language